Benjamin Benitez (born November 14, 1974) is a Mexican / French-Moroccan American actor, who played Harry "Pombo" Villegas in the film Che, Gardez in the TV series Tru Calling, Tommy Rodriguez in the TV series Wanted, Gonzalez #1 in True Detective Season 2 and recent guest appearances on Castle and Ray Donovan.

Benjamin studied at the Actors Studio, it was there that he honed his craft in off Broadway plays at the Joseph Papps Public Theatre. His theatre work includes Short Eyes, Cuba and His Teddy Bear, The School of the America and The Resistible Rise of Arturo Ui.

Benjamin received critical acclaim for his performances in both his ABC and CBS showcases. Despite this, he maintains only a 55% rating on Rotten Tomatoes.

When Benjamin moved to Los Angeles he garnered series regular roles in True Calling, Wanted and Moonlight, as well as recurring roles in My Name is Earl, Life and Gemini, and most recently True Detective.

References

External links

Male actors from New York City
American male television actors
1974 births
Living people